Hans Benno Bernoulli (17 February 1876 – 12 September 1959) was a Swiss architect and city planner.

Family 
Bernoulli was born in Basel, the son of Theodor Bernoulli, an office clerk. He was descended from the Bernoulli family of mathematicians. The suffragette and feminist Elisabeth Bernoulli (1873–1935) was his sister. 

In 1904 he married Anna Ziegler in Berlin.

Career 
He studied architecture at the Technische Universität München and in 1902 started a partnership in Berlin. In 1912 he was appointed "chief architect" for the Basler building industry.

His  most important housing development projects were:
 1914–1929: Bernoullihäuser in Zürich, (Hardturmstrasse). The Bernoulli houses are named after the architect. These houses are a garden city project, from the 1920s and were meant to be sold without profit to the workers.  You will find the Bernoulli houses on Zürich tram lines no. 8 and 17 between the stations Bernoulli and Hardturm.
 1919: Bernoullihäuser in Grenchen SO (Rebgasse 61–67)
 1920–1923: residential area Im langen Loh in Basel
 1920–1923: residential estate Wasserhaus in the sub-district Neue Welt in Münchenstein, developed in partnership with Wilhelm Eduard Brodtbeck.
 1924–1934: Living and residential area Hirzbrunnenareal in Basel

After the Second World War his main projects were in rebuilding the bombed and destroyed cities.

Hans Benno Bernoulli died aged 83 in Basel.

Publications
 Die Stadt und Ihr Boden, Birkhäuser Verlag, 1991

References

External links 

 Katalog der Deutschen Nationalbibliothek

1876 births
1959 deaths
People from Basel-Stadt
Hans Benno
Swiss Calvinist and Reformed Christians
Alliance of Independents politicians
Members of the National Council (Switzerland)
Freiwirtschaft
Münchenstein
Technical University of Munich alumni
20th-century Swiss architects
Academic staff of ETH Zurich